Elegant glass is high quality glassware created in the United States during the Depression Era. It was sold for high prices in department stores and given as wedding gifts. When new, Elegant glass would cost more than its oft-confused counterpart, Depression glass, because it was at least partially handmade, had a cleaner finish, and more vibrant colors. From the 1920s through the 1950s, Elegant glass was an alternative to fine china. Most of the Elegant glassware manufacturers closed by the end of the 1950s, and cheap glassware and imported china took its place.

Manufacturing process
Elegant glass was at least partially hand made during production. Elegant glass manufacturers produced vibrant colors that varied far more than Depression Glass.  Shades of red, blue, green, amber, yellow, smoke, amethyst, and pink were produced.  An easy way to compare the difference in color quality is to take a look at a piece of cobalt Elegant glass and place it alongside a piece of cobalt Depression Glass.  The intensity of the former piece is quite evident. Pressed Elegant glass was fire polished to get rid of the flaws in the glass. The normal flaws found in pressed glass – straw marks, raised seams, etc. were removed. The base of bowls, platters, etc. was ground so it would sit evenly on a table. Many patterns of Elegant glass were embellished with acid etching, cutting, enamel decoration, gold encrustation, platinum and gold trim.

Sale and marketing
Elegant glass was sold in the finer stores (never given away). It was also marketed as wedding patterns. It was offered as an alternative to china and crystal which were still imported due to manufacturing costs and were incredibly expensive. Many consumers purchased Elegant glass and placed it on display, only using it for very special occasions.

Products
Elegant glass patterns had a wide range of items available including:

Tableware
Tableware included plates, bowls, platters, sherbets, salt and pepper shakers, compotes, creamers, sugar bowls, epergnes, mayonnaise bowls, place holders, baskets, candy dishes, cruets, bells, candlesticks, cheese stands, bread and butter plates, baskets, bon bons, jam/jelly jars, tidbit trays, nut dishes, celery dishes, pickle dishes, lamps, cracker jars, oil and vinegar bottles, marmalade jars, and vases.

Barware
Barware includes card trays, milk pitchers, jugs, cigarette holders, coasters, cordial glasses, cocktails glasses, decanters, bitters bottles, ice buckets, water goblets, wine glasses, ashtrays, and muddlers.

Manufacturers and patterns
Companies that made Elegant glass and the patterns they produced.

Cambridge Glass Company
Apple Blossom
Byzantine
Candlelight
Caprice
Chantilly
Cleo
Chrysanthemum
Daffodil
Decagon
Diane
Elaine
Gadroon
Gloria
Imperial Hunt Scene
Imperial Victorian
Lorna
Mt. Vernon
Portia
Rosalie
Rose Point
Seashell
Springtime
Statuesque
Tally Ho
Valencia
Wildflower
Central Glass Company
Morgan
Consolidated Glass Company
Ruba Rombic
Diamond
Charade
Duncan & Miller
Buttercup
Canterbury
Caribbean
Dover
First Love
Nautical
Sandwich
Spiral Flutes
Terrace
Fenton Glass Company
Lincoln Inn
Ming
Rose Crest
Silver Crest
Sophisticated Ladies
Fostoria
American
American Lady
Baroque
Chintz
Colony
Contour
Coronet
Garland
New Garland
Fairfax No. 2375
Heather
Hermitage
Kashmir
Manor (clear, topaz, green and wisteria)
Navarre
Pioneer
Rosalie
Rose
Royal
Seville
Sun Ray
Trojan
Vesper
Versailles
Heisey Company
Carcassonne
Charter Oak
Chintz
Crystolite
Empress
Ipswich
Lariat
Lodestar
Minuet
New Era
Octagon
Old Colony
Old Sandwich
Old Williamsburg
Orchid
Plantation
Pleat & Panel
Queen Ann
Ridgeleigh
Rosalie
Saturn
Stanhope
Triplex
Twist
Victorian
Waverly
Yeoman
Imperial Glass Company
Candlewick
Cape Cod
Lily of the Valley
Mt. Vernon
Provincial
Tradition
Morgantown
Biscayne
Rosalie
Sunrise Medallion
New Martinsville Glass Company
Hostmaster (Repeal)
Florentine
Florentine (with Meadow Wreath Etch)
Janice
Moondrops
Mt. Vernon
Prelude
Radiance
Paden City Glass
Black Forest
Crow's Foot
Daisy
Gazebo
Pairpoint
Grape
Tiffin Glass Company
Cadena
Cherokee Rose
Classic
Flanders
Fuchsia
June
June Night
Mt. Vernon

Etching patterns
Companies and artists that designed acid etching, cutting, enamel decoration, gold encrustation, platinum and gold trim but did not create glass.
Lotus
Bridal Bouquet
Flanders

Pattern gallery
Cambridge

Diamond Glass Company

New Martinsville Glass Company

See also

Carnival glass
Depression glass
Goofus glass
Milk glass
Pressed glass
Satin glass
Uranium glass

References

External links
Elegant Glass Identification:
 Depression Glass Identification by SuzieMax
 Maker Marks by David Doty's Carnival Glass Website
 Glass Company Histories, Glass Patterns /Colors/ Definitions
 Worth Point - Elegant Glass VS. Depression Glass

Collecting
History of glass